is a passenger railway station in the town of Ōizumi, Gunma, Japan, operated by the private railway operator Tōbu Railway. It is numbered "TI-45".

Lines

Station layout
The station consists of a single side platform connected to the station building by a footbridge.

Adjacent stations

History
Koizumimachi Station was opened as a station of the Koizumi Line operated by Jōshū Railway company on March 12, 1917. The Koizumi Line was purchased by Tōbu Railway in 1937.

From March 17, 2012, station numbering was introduced on all Tōbu lines, with Koizumimachi Station becoming "TI-45".

Passenger statistics
In fiscal 2019, the station was used by an average of 400 passengers daily (boarding passengers only).

Surrounding area
 site of Koizumi Castle
 Ōizumi Post Office
 Koizumi shrine
 Ōizumi High School

See also
List of railway stations in Japan

References
 Zenkoku Tetsudo Jijo Daikenkyu  
 Ekisha Saihakken  
 Tetsudo Haisen Ato o Aruku

External links

 Tobu station information 
	

Tobu Koizumi Line
Stations of Tobu Railway
Railway stations in Gunma Prefecture
Railway stations in Japan opened in 1917
Ōizumi, Gunma